The 25th Central American Championships in Athletics were held at the Estadio Olímpico Palacio de los Deportes UNAH in Tegucigalpa, Honduras, between June 20–22, 2014.

A total of 44 events were contested, 22 by men and 22 by women.  In total, 6 championships records were set.  Guatemala won the overall team trophy.

Medal summary
Complete results were published.

Men

*: No points for team trophy.

Women

*: No points for team trophy.

Medal table (unofficial)

Team trophies
Guatemala won the overall team trophy.

Total

Male

Female

Participation
According to an unofficial count, 170 athletes from 7 countries participated.

 (10)
 (32)
 (39)
 (37)
 (24)
 (12)
 Panamá (16)

References

Central American Championships in Athletics
Sports competitions in Tegucigalpa
Central American Championships in Athletics
Central American Championships in Athletics
Central American Championships in Athletics
International athletics competitions hosted by Honduras